Aframomum strobilaceum is a species of plant in the ginger family, Zingiberaceae. It was first described by Frank Nigel Hepper.

References 

strobilaceum